Desert Sunrise High School is a high school in Maricopa, Arizona, in the United States. The school is in the Maricopa Unified School District, and is located on Murphy Rd and Farrell Rd in Maricopa. Its school mascot is Golden Hawks and its colors are blue, gold, and gray. Desert Sunrise opened in July 2022 with grades 9 and 10 for the 2022-23 school year. During the 2023-24 school year, the school will serve grades 9-11. Beginning in the 2024-25 school year, the school will serve grades 9-12.

Origin 
In 2018, about $26 million dollars was approved by the School Facilities Board to construct a second high school in the Maricopa Unified School District. They noticed a growing student population and need for additional classroom space. Ground was broken on May 7, 2021. The school will be built in three phases. The first phase consists of classroom space that can be scaled up as the student population grows. It will also include a gymnasium with a practice gym and cafeteria. There is also  a third building, which will house administrative offices. A soft opening was held on May 24, 2022. On the same day, ground was broken for phase 2, which includes sporting facilities, a building for a library, counseling offices, and a performance stage. Future plans will include additional classrooms, an arts complex, and a career and technical education building.

References

External links
 

Public high schools in Arizona
Maricopa, Arizona
Schools in Pinal County, Arizona